Majibacoa is a municipality and town in the Las Tunas Province of Cuba. The municipal seat is located in the town of Calixto, immediately east of Las Tunas, the provincial capital.

Demographics
In 2004, the municipality of Majibacoa had a population of 40,264.

See also
Omaja
Municipalities of Cuba
List of cities in Cuba

References

External links

 Majibacoa page on Periódico 26 website 

Populated places in Las Tunas Province